Down Low is Israeli groove metal band Betzefer's first full-length studio album and major label debut on Roadrunner Records, as well as their only album on that label. It was released on May 19, 2005, in Israel and June 6, 2005, worldwide. It is the band's first release with current bassist Rotem Inbar.

"Down Low", "Early Grave" and "Running Against" were released as singles and videos were made for those songs. "Fuckin Rock N' Roll" was released for radio airplay and as a promotional CD single, but a video was not made for the song. The ending of "Down Low" is a ripoff from Machine Head's "Davidian", though uncredited.

Although it was supposed to be the band's first album in a 5 albums deal contract with Roadrunner Records, the band left the label in December 2007, stating professional reasons, though numerous sources reported that it was the label that dropped the band due to personal reasons with the band's behavior.

Track listing

Personnel
Avital Tamir - lead vocals
Matan Cohen - guitars
Rotem Inbar - bass
Roey Berman - drums, percussion

References

2005 debut albums
Betzefer albums
Roadrunner Records albums
Albums produced by Tue Madsen